Sayyid Mumtaz Ali Deobandi  (27 September 1860 – 15 June 1935) was an Indian Sunni Muslim scholar and an advocate of women rights in the late nineteenth century. He was an alumnus of Darul Uloom Deoband. His book Huquq-e-Niswan and the journal Tehzeeb-e-Niswan that he started with his wife Muhammadi Begum are said to be pioneering works on women rights.

Biography
Sayyid Mumtaz Ali was born on 27 September 1860 in Deoband, British India. He was a fellow and contemporary of Mahmud Hasan Deobandi and studied at Darul Uloom Deoband with Muhammad Yaqub Nanautawi and Muhammad Qasim Nanautawi.

After graduating from the Deoband seminary, Mumtaz Ali moved to Lahore and established a publishing house "Darul Isha'at". On 1 July 1898, he released a journal Tehzeeb-e-Niswan under the editorship of his wife Muhammadi Begum. This journal later discontinued in 1949. In 1898, he started a publishing house called "Rifah-e-Aam Press" in Lahore which is said to the first press in Lahore whose owner was a Muslim. In 1905, he started a journal, called, Mushīr-e-Mādar (Advisor to the mother), and then the children's journal Phūl (Flower) in 1909, and laid the foundation of children's literature in Urdu.

Mumtaz Ali was honoured with title of "Shams-ul-Ulama" by the Government of British India in 1934. He died on 15 June 1935 in Lahore.

Literary works
 Huquq-e-Niswan
 Taz̲kiratulanbiyā
 Tafṣīl al-bayān fī maqāṣid al-Qurʼān (6 volumes)
 Naqsh bo uṭhe

Legacy
American historian, Gail Minault argues in her article "Sayyid Mumtaz Ali and 'Huquq un-Niswan': An Advocate of Women's Rights in Islam in the Late Nineteenth Century" that, Mumtaz Ali's "Huquq-e-Niswan was undoubtedly too far in advance of its times. Given the current debate about the importance of Muslim personal reform, however, it is well to remember this early champion of women rights in the shar'iat." Commending Mumtaz Ali's work, Tafṣīl al-bayān fī maqāṣid al-Qurʼān, former Grand Mufti of Jerusalem, Amin al-Husseini, comments that "such book does not exist even in the Arab world".This 6 volume work of Mumtaz Ali on the Quran also received praise from scholarly figures including Anwar Shah Kashmiri, Abul Kalam Azad and Syed Sulaiman Nadwi.

References

External links
 The Supremacy Myth, adapted from Sayyid Mumtaz Ali's book Huquq-e-Niswan, translated to English by Javed Anand

1860 births
1935 deaths
Darul Uloom Deoband alumni
Deobandis 
Indian Sunni Muslims
Indian magazine founders